The Modenas KR3 (later known as the Proton KR3) was a racing motorcycle made by the Malaysian motorcycle company Modenas. The bike was used in the 500cc class of grand Prix motorcycle racing from 1997 until 2001, when the company got taken over by the Malaysian automobile company Proton. Proton renamed the bike, calling it the Proton KR3 and using it for three more seasons - from 2002 to 2004 - before replacing it with the newer Proton KR5 machine.

History

The origins of the KR3 lie with the strained relationship three-time 500cc champion Kenny Roberts had with the Factory Yamaha team at the time. After Wayne Rainey became paralysed from the chest down due to a crash he sustained at the 1993 Italian Grand Prix and Yamaha's rivals Honda and Mick Doohan took multiple titles, Roberts became increasingly unhappy with Yamaha's working method in the mid 1990s. He was constantly unhappy with the progress of their bikes and even complained many times publicly that the factory did not listen to his feedback on how to improve their motorcycles.

Because of this, he made an announcement that surprised everyone in 1996 – he was breaking away from the Factory Yamaha team - after 25 years of close collaboration - at the end of the 1996 season, working together with the Modenas company to create a new motorcycle for the newly formed Team Roberts in 1997. The main reasons why Modenas decided to work together with Roberts was for two reasons: The company hoped that some of the technology would eventually make their way into their future models, and that participation in the 500cc would make their brand more known amongst the public.

The KR team decided to move the base of operations to the "Motorsport Valley" in the United Kingdom where some Formula 1 and race car teams are based and began working together with Tom Walkinshaw Racing (TWR).

They decided to create a unique three-cylinder, two-stroke, 500cc machine since the rules at the time gave three-cylinder machines a 10kg weight advantage over the usual four-cylinder bikes. The idea was that the lower weight allowed the bike to be more agile and carry more speed mid-corner. This was also deemed as an advantage as the racetracks during this time had more corners than long straights for the four-cylinder machines to utilize, some examples being Shah Alam and Donington Park. However, they also were aware that a three-cylinder bike would make less horsepower compared to a four-cylinder one. To solve this problem, the team focused on improving volumetric efficiency (how much fuel-air mixture the engine could induct).

The engine design was supervised by Bud Askland, the father of the team's manager Chuck Askland. They created a 498cc engine with "square" dimensions i.e. same bore and stroke figures of 59.6 mm x 59.6 mm. The Vee-angle between the cylinders was set at nearly 180o with two cylinders down below and one up top. The frame was designed to give the bike better handling characteristics. The KR team worked with TWR and French chassis maker FTR, which resulted in an aluminium twin-spar "deltabox" frame that's smaller and lighter than conventional Japanese designs at the time. The headstock featured eccentric carriers which would allow adjustments of the steering's rake angle and trail. There were also eccentric carriers in the swingarm mount which were created to adjust the height of the swingarm pivot. These were completely new and unheard of at the time. Even the fueling system was ahead of its time, the team adopting electronic carburetors without float bowls which used ducted air to atomize the fuel, much like a fuel-injection system. KR hoped that such a setup would avoid the fuel from emulsifying from intense vibrations. Arrow made an exhaust system for the engine. The result of this was an engine that produced 160 hp in the early years, and the team went on to improve the engine, producing 180 hp in 2002. The bodywork was designed in such a way that it would wrap tightly around the frame for a smaller frontal profile. Consequently, the radiator was moved to under the seat where ducts supplied cooling air to it.

Season progress

1997
At the debut year, the rider line-up consisted of Kenny Roberts Jr. and Jean-Michel Bayle and team's sponsor was Marlboro. It was initially thought that the engine’s layout gave the engine good self-balancing inertial forces (of the pistons going up and down and the rotating crankshaft), but the bike frequently underperformed and suffered many breakdowns (especially crankshaft spreadings frequently broke down) as well as driver DNFs, - 14 to be exact - achieving a best place finish of eighth, scoring a total of 68 points and ending fifth in the constructor standings. Additionally, there was no controlled-tyre ruling back then, thus the tryes were manufactured to each specific bike in the paddock. New and small teams such as the KR team often had to use old tyres or those designed for other bikes, sometimes even both. It meant that KR could not capitalize on their handling.

1998
For the 1998 season, Bayle was replaced with Ralf Waldmann. The team continued to underperform all throughout the year, but did better than its debut year and scored a total of 105 points with a best place finish of sixth, courtesy of Roberts Jr, finishing fourth in the constructor standings.. The KR3 was supremely fast in midcorner and there were other riders who commented that they were led into entering corners too fast behind it. However, when the situation was reversed, the KR3 riders found themselves blocked by the slower four-cylinder machines and then outgunned at the corner exits.

1999
In 1999, the rider line-up significantly changed. Kenny Roberts Jr. left the team and went to the Factory Suzuki team. His replacement came in the form of an American rookie called Mike Hale, along with three replacement drivers; José David de Gea, Mark Willis and James Whitham. KR lost its Marlboro sponsorship and renamed itself before the start of the season, going by the name of Proton KR Modenas after Proton decided to sponsor the team.

The lack of experience amongst the riders did not help and the team only scored a total of 17 points - their worst result ever - and only managed a best-place finish of twelfth. The team also finished a lowly seventh in the constructor championship.

2000
The KR team decided to change its rider line-up once more in 2000, letting go of Mike Hale and making David de Gea a permanent rider for the season, along with Luca Cadalora, Anthony Gobert and Mark Willis as replacement riders when José was not available.

The team did better than last year but still struggled compared to the competition, earning 30 points, scoring a best-place finish of eighth and finishing sixth in the constructor championship.

2001
In 2001, Proton took over the Kenny Roberts team and changed its name to Proton Team KR. The bike name changed as well, the new name being the Proton KR3. In terms of rider line-up, David de Gea was replaced with Dutch rider Jurgen van den Goorbergh and the replacement riders were replaced with a new wildcard rider: Kurtis Roberts.

The team performed more consistently and even managed to outscore some satellite Yamaha and Honda teams on certain occasions. Overall, the team scored 65 points, managed a best-place finish of seventh and finished fourth in the constructor championship, equalling the result of its debut year in 1997.

2002
2002 would be the best year for the team. van der Goorbergh was let go and the team decided to get two regular riders again: the experienced Nobuatsu Aoki and Jeremy McWilliams, along with David García as a wildcard rider. McWilliams surprised friend and foe by scoring the team's first provisional pole at the 2002 German Grand Prix and the only real pole position at the 2002 Australian Grand Prix on the KR3 machine and the team performed consistently throughout the season, scoring a total of 122 points - the most the team had ever scored -, getting a best-place finish of sixth and finishing fourth in the constructor standings - outscoring the new factory Aprilia and Kawasaki teams as a result.

2003
No riser line-ups occurred in 2003, and no replacement or wildcard riders were called in either. This was the last year for the bike as it was gradually replaced by the newer Proton KR5 motorbike during this season, and would be made obsolete completely from 2004 onwards.

The team struggled more than least compared to its competitors. It reached a total of 46 points, got a best-place finish of sixth and finished sixth in the constructor standings, narrowly losing out to the Factory Suzuki team but staying well ahead of the factory Kawasaki team.

Specifications

References

Grand Prix motorcycles
Motorcycles introduced in 2000
Two-stroke motorcycles